Agromyces subbeticus is a bacterium from the genus of Agromyces which has been isolated from cyanobacterial biofilm from the Cueva de los Murciélagos in Zuheros from Spain.

References 

Microbacteriaceae
Bacteria described in 2005